Massimo Cierro (born 7 May 1964) is a former professional tennis player from Italy.

Career
Cierro never won a Grand Slam match. He lost to 15th seed Scott Davis at 1985 US Open, Patrick McEnroe in the 1992 Australian Open and Henri Leconte at the 1992 French Open, all in straight sets.

The biggest win of his career was at the Championship Series event, the Italian Open, in 1991, when he defeated world number 13 Karel Nováček.

Cierro was a quarter-finalist at Bordeaux in 1989, San Marino in 1989 and Palermo in 1991.
 
Partnering Alessandro de Minicis he made two ATP doubles finals, in Saint-Vincent, losing both.

Grand Prix career finals

Doubles: 2 (0–2)

Challenger titles

Singles: (3)

Doubles: (5)

References

External links
 
 

1964 births
Living people
Italian male tennis players
Tennis players from Naples
Mediterranean Games medalists in tennis
Mediterranean Games silver medalists for Italy
Competitors at the 1991 Mediterranean Games